Estevan is an alternative spelling of Esteban, the Spanish variant of the first name Stephen. It can refer to:

Places
 Estevan, a city in Saskatchewan, Canada
 Rural Municipality of Estevan No. 5, rural municipality
 San Estevan, Belize, a town in Orange Walk District, Belize
 Estevan Point, a lighthouse in Vancouver Island, Canada

See also
Stephen
Esteban (name)